Lai Fang-mei (born 30 December 1960) is an archer who represented Chinese Taipei.

Archery

Lai finished twelfth at the 1988 Summer Olympic Games in the women's individual event. She also finished eleventh in the women's team event as part of the Chinese Taipei team as part of the Chinese Taipei team.

At the 1990 Asian Games she won a silver medal in the women's team event.

In 1992 Lai finished seventh in the women's individual event beating Nathalie Hibon and Joanna Nowicka before losing to Kim Soo-nyung in the quarterfinals. She finished eleventh in the women's team event.

References

External links 
 Profile on worldarchery.org

1960 births
Living people
Taiwanese female archers
Olympic archers of Taiwan
Archers at the 1988 Summer Olympics
Archers at the 1992 Summer Olympics
Archers at the 1990 Asian Games
Asian Games medalists in archery
Asian Games silver medalists for Chinese Taipei
Medalists at the 1990 Asian Games
20th-century Taiwanese women